Ullathai Killathe is a 1999 Indian Tamil-language drama film, written and directed by Vejey Kannan. The film stars Suresh, Karan and Khushbu, while Janagaraj and Senthil portray supporting roles. Music for the film was composed by Deva and the film opened to mixed reviews in March 1999.

Cast

 Suresh
 Khushbu
 Karan as Major Prakash
 Supraja
 Janagaraj
 Senthil
 Jai Ganesh
 Ajay Rathnam
 Chinni Jayanth
 Kumarimuthu
 Ponnambalam
 Ramesh Khanna
 Singamuthu
 Kullamani
 Sathyapriya
 Kavitha
 Babilona
 Hamsa Devi
 Sonam

Production
During production, the film was reported in the media as an attempted comeback for Khushbu.

Soundtrack
Soundtrack was composed by Deva.

Release
The film had begun production in January 1997 but had a delayed, low-profile release across Tamil Nadu in 1999.

References

1999 films
1990s Tamil-language films
Indian romantic drama films
Films scored by Deva (composer)
1999 directorial debut films
1999 romantic drama films